is a single-member constituency of the House of Representatives in the Diet of Japan. The constituency consists of Higashi-ku, Fukuoka and Hakata-ku, Fukuoka.

History
In the past, Ryu Matsumoto of DP was unrivaled, but he lost to Takahiro Inoue of LDP in 2012 Japanese general election due to a slip of the tongue while serving as Minister of Reconstruction.
Meanwhile, Yūji Shinkai, a LDP member like Inoue, was seeking to run in the district.
Therefore, LDP decided to nominate Inoue and Shinkai as independent candidates and nominate the winning candidate. As a result of the election, Inoue won, and then Inoue has continued to win in a stable election campaign.

List of representatives

References

Fukuoka Prefecture
Districts of the House of Representatives (Japan)